NGC 5837 is a barred spiral galaxy in the constellation Boötes. It was discovered on 19 June 1887 by Lewis A. Swift.

Supernovae
A Type Ia Supernova, SN 2014ac, was discovered 9 March 2014, and on 16 June 2015, a Type IIN Supernova, SN 2015z, was discovered.

References

External links 
 

Barred spiral galaxies
Boötes
5837
09686
053817